Part-Time Wife is a low budget black and white 1961 British comedy film.

Plot
Footloose and fancy-free bachelor Drew needs to find a wife to impress a visiting rich uncle. The uncle has made it clear Drew will only inherit his business when he's married and respectable. Drew's friends Tom and Jenny agree to help him out by allowing Jenny to pose as his wife. Tom is a struggling insurance salesman, and Drew promises him a big insurance deal to add incentive. Farcical complications ensue.

Cast
Anton Rodgers as Tom
Nyree Dawn Porter as Jenny
Kenneth J. Warren as Drew
Henry McCarthy as Whitworth
Mark Singleton as Detective
Neil Hallett as Detective
Susan Richards as Miss Aukland
Raymond Rollett as Barnsdale
June Cunningham as Blonde
Dudy Nimmo as Miss Fallon
Anna Gerber as Receptionist
Jan Conrad as Bartender
Alan Browning as Police Sergeant
Max Butterfield as Joe
George Roderick as Al
Michael Peake as Phil

Critical reception
The Radio Times gave the film two out of five stars, writing, "competent performances fail to add sparkle to the tired plot", while myreviewer.com wrote, "whilst you won’t laugh aloud, it’ll certainly raise a warm smile. It’s also a great little time-capsule to what looks and feels like a completely different world."

References

External links

1961 films
1961 comedy films
British comedy films
1960s English-language films
1960s British films